Ranganayaki Pathmanathan was a Sri Lankan politician. She was a member of the Parliament of Sri Lanka. She was the nominated member for Pottuvil, replacing M. Canagaratnam.

References

District ministers of Sri Lanka
Living people
Members of the 8th Parliament of Sri Lanka
People from Eastern Province, Sri Lanka
Sri Lankan Tamil politicians
Sri Lankan Tamil women
United National Party politicians
Women legislators in Sri Lanka
Year of birth missing (living people)